Gupte is a surname. Notable people with this surname include:

 Amole Gupte (born 1962) is an Indian screenwriter, actor, and director
 Avadhoot Gupte
 B.A. Gupte (1851–1925), Indian ethnographer
 Baloo Gupte (1934–2005), Indian cricket player
 Chinmay Gupte (born 1972), Indian-born English orthopaedic surgeon and cricket player
 Chitaman Gupte (1916–1994), Indian cricket player
 Lalita D. Gupte
 Mahendra Gupte (1931–2017), Indian cricket umpire
 Narayan Murlidhar Gupte (1872–1947), Indian poet and scholar
 Neelima Gupte, Indian physicist
 Partho Gupte, Indian child actor
 Prabhakar Gupte, Indian cricket player
 Rango Bapuji Gupte
 Sakharam Hari Gupte (1718–1779)
 Subhash Gupte (1929–2002), cricket player
 V. M. Gupte, Indian cricket umpire
 Vandana Gupte, Indian actress